Gironico is a frazione of the comune (municipality) of Colverde in the Province of Como in the Italian region Lombardy, located about  northwest of Milan and about  southwest of Como. It was a separate comune until 2014.

 

Cities and towns in Lombardy